was a Japanese all-female band formed in 2010 and associated with Platinum Production. The members consist of three fashion models: Sumire Yoshida (lead vocals and guitar), Aina Yamauchi (bass guitar), and Yukako Kurosaka (keyboard). Ayana Sōgawa was originally the group's keyboardist until she left in 2012.

Silent Siren first released two independent extended plays, Sai Sai and Love Shiru, in 2012. After getting signed to Dreamusic, the group made their major label debut with "Sweet Pop!"

History

2010–2012: Indies era, Sai Sai, and Love Shiru

Silent Siren was formed in 2010, with amateur fashion models Sumire Yoshida as lead vocals and guitar, Hinako Umemura on drums, Aina Yamauchi on bass guitar, and Ayana Sogawa on keyboard. Yoshida and Umemura, who both appeared in the fashion magazine Cutie, co-founded the band and invited Yamauchi, who appeared in aomoji-kei magazines, and Vivi model Sogawa to join. Silent Siren released their debut mini album, Sai Sai, on February 8, 2012, with the song "All Right ('Ima' o Kakeru)" used as the official support song for Agestock 2011, the largest college student event in Japan. They followed up with their second mini album, Love Shiru, on July 4, 2012.

2012–2014: Major label debut, Start, and 31 Wonderland

After the release of Love Shiru, Sogawa departed from the group. In August 2012, Yamauchi recommended her friend, Yukako Kurosaka, as a replacement. Kurosaka, who appeared in the magazine Ray as an amateur model and a Wednesday panelist on the variety show Zip!, was announced as a member during a live show on September 13, 2012. To promote their major label debut, the CD single "Want Chu" was released as a magazine gift with the November 2012 issue of Cutie.

Silent Siren released their first single, "Sweet Pop!", on November 14, 2012, which was featured as the ending theme song to the television program Tokyo Brand New Girls. "Stella" was released as their second single on February 20, 2013, and was featured as the ending theme song to the television program Happy Music.

2015–2016: Silent Siren, and S
In January 2015, Silent Siren performed their first solo concert at Nippon Budokan, which was the fastest any all-female band had performed at the prestigious venue following a major-label debut. That same year, the band created theme songs for the anime series Onyankopon and Shinkansen Henkei Robo Shinkalion, the live-action film of Anohana, and the Japanese restaurant chain Tenkaippin.

In March 2016, the band released their fourth album S, which reached 3rd place in the Oricon weekly ranking. On December 30, 2016, at the Silent Siren 2016 End of 2016 Special Live Dream on! held at the Tokyo Metropolitan Gymnasium, the band announced they were changing the stylization of their name to all capitals and were moving from Dolly Music to EMI Records.

2017–2018: Girls Power
In March 2017, Silent Siren released their 12th single "Fujiyama Disco" and the band's first best album Silent Siren Selection. In May, they released their 13th single "Akane/ Awaawa", and their 14th single "Just Meet" in October. In December, they released their 5th album Girls Power.

In March 2018, they released the single "Tenkaippin no Theme". In July 2018, they released their 15th single "19 summer note". In November 2018, they released their 16th single "Go Way!".

2019–2020: 31313 
In March 2019, the band released their 6th album 31313, followed by the digital single "Shigatsu no Kaze (四月の風; April Wind)" in April. In December, they released the EP Hero.

In April 2020, Silent Siren launched an official YouTube channel to commemorate their 10th anniversary.

2020–2021: Mix10th and Silent Siren Year-end Special Live Tour 2021
On June 18, 2020, Poppin'Party of Aimi collaboration song with " . Up To You feat Aimi from Poppin'Party " is distributed released the next day music video has been published.

On September 2, 2020, Released the 7th album mix10th.

On September 23, 2020, It was announced that member Hinako (Hinako Umemura) will be the first voice actor to play the role of D4DJ 's "Takao Toka".

On May 4, 2021, Aina Yamauchi announces new coronavirus infection.

On August 25, 2021, Yukako Kurosaka announces new coronavirus infection.

On September 25, 2021, Hinako Umemura leaves the band with "Kirara Revenge ~ Saisai 10 Years Old Festival ~".

On October 22, 2021, Announced that the activity will be suspended within the year.

On December 30, 2021, "SILENT SIREN Year-end Special LIVE TOUR 2021" FAMILIA "" will be suspended due to the final performance of the Tokyo Metropolitan Gymnasium .

Members 

All members use both their birthnames and professional nicknames in media.

Current Members
  – lead vocals, guitar (2010–2021)
  – bass, backing vocals (2010–2021)
  – keyboard, backing vocals (2012–2021)

Former members
 Yana – keyboard, backing vocals (2010–2012)
  ( – drums, backing vocals (2010–2021)

Backing band
  — backing guitar (2012–2021)
  — backing guitar (2012–2015)

Timeline

Discography

Studio albums

Mini albums

Compilation albums

Singles

Video releases

Collaborations / other
 July 10, 2013:  "Lovely Kiss 2 mixed" by DJ Shima Yuri with Go Go Friends (#10 Sweet Pop! / Silent Siren)
 June 25, 2014: "Lovely Kiss 3 mixed" by DJ Shima Yuri with Go Go Friends (#3 Besan / Silent Siren)
 April 4, 2018: "Sailor Star Song" by Naoko Takeuchi (#8 Pretty Guardian Sailor Moon The 25th Anniversary Memorial Tribute / Silent Siren)
 July 31, 2019: "No Girl No Cry" with Poppin'Party
 April 8, 2022: "Giri Giri" Kaguya-sama: Love is War Season 3 opening theme - by Masayuki Suzuki ft. Silent Siren

Photobooks 
 March 3, 2014: "Wonderbook"

References

External links 
 

All-female bands
Japanese rock music groups
Japanese female models
Musical groups established in 2011
2011 establishments in Japan
Dreamusic artists
Universal Music Japan artists